Vilcas Huamán (from Quechua Willka Waman) is a province in the eastern part of the Ayacucho Region in Peru.

Boundaries
North: Huamanga Province
East: Apurímac Region
South: Sucre Province
West: Cangallo Province and Víctor Fajardo Province

Geography 
Other mountains are listed below:

Political division
The province is divided into eight districts (Spanish: distritos, singular: distrito), each of which is headed by a mayor (alcalde). The districts, with their capitals in parenthesis, are:
 Vilcas Huamán (Vilcashuamán)
Accomarca (Accomarca)
Carhuanca
Concepción
Huambalpa
Independencia
Saurama
Vischongo (Vischongo)

Ethnic groups 
The people in the province are mainly indigenous citizens of Quechua descent. Quechua is the language which the majority of the population (89.62%) learnt to speak in childhood, 10.06% of the residents started speaking using the Spanish language (2007 Peru Census).

Archaeology 
Some of the most important archaeological sites in the province are Usnu, Inti Watana, Pilluchu, Pukara and Puntay Urqu.

See also 
 Pumaqucha
 Titankayuq

Sources 

Provinces of the Ayacucho Region